General Sir Henry Cholmondeley Jackson    (12 August 1879 – 19 October 1972) was a British Army General who achieved high office in the 1930s.

Military career

Jackson was commissioned into the 1st Bedfordshire Regiment in 1899. He then became Adjutant at the Mounted Infantry School at Longmoor in 1908. He became General Officer Commanding 50th (Northumbrian) Division on the Western Front in April 1918 during the First World War.

After the War he became Commander of 5th Infantry Brigade from 1919 and then Commandant at the Machine Gun School at Netheravon from 1924 before moving on to become Director of Military Training at Army Headquarters in India in 1926. He became General Officer Commanding 2nd Division in 1931 and then General Officer Commanding-in-Chief for Western Command in 1936 before retiring in 1939.

He was Colonel of the Bedfordshire and Hertfordshire Regiment from 1935 to 1948.

He lived at Piddletrenthide near Dorchester in Dorset.

Family
In 1919 he married Dorothy Nina Seymour.

References

External links

|-

|-

|-

 

|-
 

1879 births
1972 deaths
Burials in Dorset
British Army generals
British Army generals of World War I
Knights Commander of the Order of the Bath
Companions of the Order of St Michael and St George
Companions of the Distinguished Service Order
Bedfordshire and Hertfordshire Regiment officers